Husum is the capital of the Kreis (district) Nordfriesland in Schleswig-Holstein, Germany. The town was the birthplace of the novelist Theodor Storm, who coined the epithet "the grey town by the sea". It is also the home of the annual international piano festival Raritäten der Klaviermusik (Rarities of Piano Music) founded in 1986.

History
Husum was first mentioned as Husembro in 1252, when king Abel was murdered.

Like most towns on the North Sea, Husum was always strongly influenced by storm tides. In 1362 a disastrous storm tide, the "Grote Mandrenke" flooded the town and carved out the inland harbour. Before this date Husum was not situated directly on the coast. The people of the city took advantage of this opportunity and built a marketplace, which led to a great economic upturn.

Between 1372 and 1398 the population of Husum grew rapidly, and two villages, Oster-Husum (East-Husum) and Wester-Husum (West-Husum), were founded.

The name Husum is first mentioned in 1409. It is shown on the Carta Marina in the Frisian form of Husem.

Its first church was built in 1431. Wisby rights were granted it in 1582, and in 1603 it received municipal privileges from Alexander, Duke of Schleswig-Holstein-Sonderburg. It suffered greatly from inundations in 1634 and 1717.

Geography
Husum is located on the North Sea by the Bay of Husum; 82 km W of Kiel, 139 km NW of Hamburg and 43 km SW of Flensburg.

Subdivisions
 Zentrum (Danish: Indreby)
 Nordhusum (Danish: Nørre Husum)
 Porrenkoog (Danish: Porrekog, North Frisian: Porekuuch)
 Osterhusum (Danish: Øster Husum), Osterhusumfeld
 Altstadt
 Norderschlag (Danish: Nørreslag)
 Dreimühlen (Danish: Tremølle)
 Rödemis (Danish: Rødemis, North Frisian: Rööms)
 Fischersiedlung
 Neustadt (Danish: Nystad(en))
 Gewerbegebiet
 Schauendahl (Danish: Skovdal)
 Kielsburg (Danish: Kilsborg)
 Rosenburg 
 Schobüll (Danish: Skobøl, North Frisian: Schööbel)
 Halebüll (Danish: Halebøl, North Frisian: Hälbel)
 Hockensbüll (Danish: Hokkensbøl, North Frisian: Hukensbel)
 Lund

Culture

Being a tourist resort and the gateway to the North Frisian Islands, Husum offers many cultural features.

Festival Raritäten der Klaviermusik
This international festival of rare piano music, specialising in unknown classical piano music, was founded in 1986 by Peter Froundjian, and takes place in the town's castle.

Museums

The  (Wasserreihe 31) was the house of Theodor Storm. It is home to an exhibition about the novelist and his works.
The  (Zingel 15) shows ships from the Middle Ages to the present. The models on display give a good impression of life on the coast and at sea.
The Ostenfelder Bauernhaus (Nordhusumer Str.13) is an old farmhouse and the oldest open-air museum in Germany.

Sights
, collapsed 1807, re-erected 1833
The , 1582, was a residence of the dukes of Holstein-Gottorp
Old Town Hall, 1601
New Town Hall, 1988/1989

Clubs
 The  is a famous marching band from the district of Rödemis.

Husum is also home of two football clubs, the Husumer SV and the Rödemisser SV.

Husum Cricket Club is based at the Mikkelberg-Kunst-und-Cricket Center which has in the past hosted international women's cricket matches.  The ground is located in nearby Hattstedt.

Twinning
Husum is twinned with:

Infrastructure
Husum station is located on the Westerland–Hamburg line (Marsh Railway), the Husum–Bad St. Peter-Ording line to the Eiderstedt peninsula and the Husum–Jübek line, which connects to the Neumünster–Flensburg line and Kiel.

Education

Grammar schools 
 Hermann-Tast-Schule, humanistic grammar school since 1527, one of the oldest schools in the state of Schleswig-Holstein.
 Theodor-Storm-Schule

High schools
 Gemeinschaftsschule Husum-Nord
 Ferdinand-Tönnies-Schule
 Husum Danske Skole (Danish School)

Elementary schools
 Iven-Agßen-Schule, since 1619, one of the oldest elementary schools in Germany.
 Bürgerschule
 Klaus-Groth-Schule
 Bornschool in Schobüll

Notable people

 Herwig Ahrendsen (born 1948), handball player, competed in the 1972 Summer Olympics
 Georg Beseler (1809–1888), Prussian jurist and politician
 Margarete Böhme (1867–1939), German writer
 Adolf Brütt (1855–1939), sculptor
 Nicolaus Bruhns (1665–1697), organist in Husum, 1689–1697, an important influence on Johann Sebastian Bach
 Goslar Carstens (de) (1894–1978), German attorney, local politician, local historian and author; Mayor of Husum in 1946
 Claus-Frenz Claussen (born 1939), ENT-Medician, University teacher, author, editor, artist and inventor
 Johan Georg Forchhammer (1794–1865), mineralogist and geologist
 Peter Wilhelm Forchhammer (1801–1894), classical archaeologist
 Lars Hartig (born 1990), rower, competed in the 2012 Summer Olympics
 Hans Hartz (1943–2002), musician and songwriter
 Freya Hoffmeister (born 1964), business owner and athlete who holds several sea kayaking endurance records
 Matthias Holst (born 1982), football player
 Isgaard (born 1972), singer
 Morten Jensen (born 1987), football goalkeeper
 Friedrich Lübker (1811–1867), educator and philologist
 Richard Petersen (de) (1865–1946), Technical Director for the construction of the Wuppertaler Schwebebahn
 Joachim Friedrich Quack (born 1966), Egyptologist and recipient of the Leibniz Prize
 Ernst Graf zu Reventlow (1869–1943), naval officer, journalist and Nazi politician 
 Fanny zu Reventlow (1871–1918), painter and writer
 Emil Schiller (de) (1865–1945), pastor and missionary in Japan
 Theodor Storm (1817−1888), novelist of German realism style
 Janina Uhse (born 1989), actress 
 Oskar Vogt (1870–1959), neuroanatomy, psychiatrist; He dissected the brain of Lenin in the 1920s
 Johann Wadephul (born 1963), CDU politician
 Jan Wayne (born 1974), electronic dance music DJ and producer

References

Sources

External links

 
 Husum in old postcards

Towns in Schleswig-Holstein
Port cities and towns of the North Sea
Nordfriesland
Populated coastal places in Germany (North Sea)